Wan Exiang (born May 1956) is a Chinese politician and jurist who served as a vice chairperson of the Standing Committee of the National People's Congress from 2018 to 2023. He was the chairman of the Revolutionary Committee of the Chinese Kuomintang between 2012 and 2022.

Biography 
Wan Exiang was born in Gong'an, Hubei in 1956. Wan received his B.A degree from Wuhan University in 1980, LL.M. degree from Yale Law School in 1987 and LL.D. degree from Wuhan University School of Law in 1988.  After graduation, he joined the faculty of Wuhan University.

Wan was elected as the vice president of the Intermediate People's Court of Wuhan in 1996, vice president of the High People's Court of Hubei in 1999, and Vice President of the Supreme People's Court of China in 2000. He was elected the chairman of the Revolutionary Committee of the Chinese Kuomintang in 2002.

Wan attended the Group of 20 parliament speakers in Tokyo, Japan, Nov. 4, 2019. He announced that China is ready to strengthen parliamentary exchanges with Japan to better promote the improvement and development of bilateral relations.

On 7 December 2020, pursuant to Executive Order 13936, the US Department of the Treasury imposed sanctions on all 14 Vice Chairperson of the National People's Congress, including Wan, for "undermining Hong Kong's autonomy and restricting the freedom of expression or assembly."

References

External links 
 Wan Exiang's profile at Wuhan University website 

1956 births
Living people
20th-century Chinese judges
21st-century Chinese judges
Chairperson and vice chairpersons of the Standing Committee of the 12th National People's Congress
Chairperson and vice chairpersons of the Standing Committee of the 13th National People's Congress
Individuals sanctioned by the United States under the Hong Kong Autonomy Act
Members of the 9th Chinese People's Political Consultative Conference
Members of the Revolutionary Committee of the Chinese Kuomintang
Members of the Standing Committee of the 10th Chinese People's Political Consultative Conference
Members of the Standing Committee of the 11th Chinese People's Political Consultative Conference
People from Jingzhou
Supreme People's Court judges
Wuhan University alumni
Academic staff of Wuhan University
Yale Law School alumni